Muricauda is a genus in the phylum Bacteroidota.

Species
The genus Maribacter comprises the following species:

 Muricauda aequoris Guo et al. 2020
 Muricauda alvinocaridis Liu et al. 2020
 Muricauda amoyensis Li et al. 2019
 Muricauda amphidinii Chen et al. 2021

 Muricauda aquimarina Yoon et al. 2005
 Muricauda beolgyonensis Lee et al. 2012
 Muricauda eckloniae (Bae et al. 2007) García-López et al. 2020
 Muricauda flava (Yoon and Oh 2012) García-López et al. 2020
 Muricauda flavescens Yoon et al. 2005
 Muricauda hadalis Zhang et al. 2020
 Muricauda hymeniacidonis Park 2019
 Muricauda indica Zhang et al. 2018
 Muricauda iocasae Liu et al. 2018
 Muricauda koreensis García-López et al. 2020
 Muricauda lutaonensis Arun et al. 2009

 Muricauda lutimaris Yoon et al. 2008
 Muricauda marina Su et al. 2017
 Muricauda maritima Guo et al. 2020
 Muricauda nanhaiensis Dang et al. 2019
 Muricauda oceanensis Guo et al. 2020
 Muricauda oceani Dong et al. 2020
 Muricauda ochracea Kim et al. 2020
 Muricauda olearia Hwang et al. 2009
 Muricauda pacifica Zhang et al. 2015
 Muricauda ruestringensis Bruns et al. 2001
 Muricauda sediminis Zhu et al. 2021
 Muricauda taeanensis Kim et al. 2013
 Muricauda zhangzhouensis Yang et al. 2013

References

Further reading 
 

Flavobacteria
Gram-negative bacteria
Bacteria genera